Schinia zuni is a moth of the family Noctuidae. It is found in North America, including Arizona and New Mexico.

The wingspan is about 26 mm.

External links
Images
Butterflies and Moths of North America
High Country Lepidopterists 20th Annual Meeting Schinia zuni rediscovered after 60 years

Schinia
Moths of North America
Moths described in 1950